Thomas Pope (1507–1559) was founder of Trinity College, Oxford.

Thomas Pope may also refer to:

 Thomas Pope (actor) (died 1603), comedian and acrobat
 Thomas Pope, 2nd Earl of Downe (1622–1660), English Royalist
 Thomas Pope (Canadian politician) (1825–1863), mayor of Quebec City
 Thomas A. Pope (1894–1989), American Medal of Honor recipient
 Tom Pope (born 1985), English football player
 Thomas Pope (MP for Gloucester) (died 1400), English politician
 Tommy Pope (born 1979), American stand-up comedian, writer, and actor
 Tommy Pope (politician) (born 1962), American politician in South Carolina